Canaanimys is an extinct genus of caviomorph known from the Loreto of Peru.

Description 
Canaanimys is known from the holotype MUSM 1890, a right second molar and from some referred teeth including MUSM 1889, MUSM 1891, MUSM 1892, MUSM 1893, MUSM 1894 and MUSM 1895. It was collected in the CTA-27 Locality (or Maquía locality), from the uppermost part of the Yahuarango Formation, dating to the latest Lutetian stage of the late Middle Eocene, about 41 million years ago. It was a tiny rodent as its body mass estimated at approx. 40 g. A cladistic analysis found it to be the basalmost known caviomorph, and one of the oldest (the other being Cachiyacuy from the same locality).

Etymology 
Canaanimys was first named by Pierre-Olivier Antoine, Laurent Marivaux, Darin A. Croft, Guillaume Billet, Morgan Ganerød, Carlos Jaramillo, Thomas Martin, Maëva J. Orliac, Julia Tejada, Ali J. Altamirano, Francis Duranthon, Grégory Fanjat,
Sonia Rousse and Rodolfo Salas Gismondi in 2012 and the type species is Canaanimys maquiensis. The generic name is derived from Canaan, name of a local Shipibo native community, and mys, Greek for "mouse". The specific name is named after its finding place.

References 

Hystricognath rodents
Eocene rodents
Eocene mammals of South America
Divisaderan
Paleogene Peru
Fossils of Peru
Fossil taxa described in 2012
Extinct animals of Peru